Ralph Ashley (died 7 April 1606) was an English Jesuit lay-brother who became involved with the aftermath of the Gunpowder Plot. He is a Catholic martyr, beatified in 1929.

Life
Ashley is first heard of as cook at Douay College, which he left on 28 April 1590 for the English College, Valladolid. Here he entered the Society of Jesus, but after a time returned to England because of ill-health.

He fell in with Father Tesimond (Greenway), who eulogizes the courage he had displayed among the Dutch, by whom he had been captured during his journey. He landed in England on 9 March 1598 and was sent to serve Edward Oldcorne.

Eight years later, he and Oldcorne were arrested at Hindlip Hall, near Worcester, and were committed to the Tower of London, together with Henry Garnet, and Nicholas Owen, another lay-brother, servant to Garnet. The two servants were tortured, Owen dying. Ashley's confessions are still available.

He was ultimately remanded with Oldcorne to Worcester, where they were tried, condemned and executed together at Red Hill. He accompanied his master to their execution. It is said that as Oldcorne waited on the ladder to die, Ashley kissed his feet and said, "“What a happy man am I to follow the steps of my Father unto death." Oldcorne died with the name of St Winifred on his lips. When Ashley came to die he prayed and asked for forgiveness and said that like Oldcorne he was dying for his religion and not for being a traitor.

Edward Oldcorne and Ashley were beatified in 1929.

References

Attribution

1606 deaths
16th-century English Jesuits
17th-century English Jesuits
16th-century births
English beatified people
Executed Gunpowder Plotters
People executed by Stuart England by hanging, drawing and quartering
17th-century venerated Christians
Year of birth unknown
Executed English people
One Hundred and Seven Martyrs of England and Wales